The 2015–16 season was Doncaster Rovers's 137th season in their existence, 13th consecutive season in the Football League and second consecutive season in League One. Along with League One, the club also competed in the FA Cup, League Cup and JP Trophy. The season covered the period from 1 July 2015 to 30 June 2016.

Squad

Detailed Overview 
Caps and goals up to the start of season 2015–16. Players in bold were signed in the January window.

Statistics 
This includes any players featured in a match day squad in any competition.

|-
|colspan="14"|Players who left the club during the season:

|}

Goals record

Disciplinary record

Transfers

Transfers in

Loans in

Loans out

Transfers out

Competitions

Pre–season friendlies
On 26 May 2015, Doncaster Rovers announced Sunderland will visit during pre–season in a friendly. A day later it was announced Wolverhampton Wanderers will visit as part of their pre–season preparations. The club announced on 28 May 2015 they will host Nottingham Forest on 21 July 2015. On 5 June 2015, Doncaster Rovers confirmed they will kick–off pre–season preparations off with a trip to Frickley Athletic. On 8 June 2015, a home friendly against Middlesbrough was announced.

League One

League table

Matches
On 17 June 2015, the fixtures for the forthcoming season were announced.

FA Cup
On 26 October 2015, the first round draw was made, Doncaster Rovers were drawn at home against Stalybridge Celtic. On 9 November 2015, the second round draw was made, Doncaster Rovers were drawn away against Cambridge United. On 7 December 2015, the third round draw was made, Doncaster Rovers were drawn home against Stoke City.

League Cup
On 16 June 2015, the first round draw was made, Doncaster Rovers were drawn at home against Leeds United. In the second round, Doncaster Rovers were drawn at home to Ipswich Town.

Football League Trophy
On 8 August 2015, live on Soccer AM the draw for the first round of the Football League Trophy was drawn by Toni Duggan and Alex Scott. On 5 September 2015, the second round draw was shown live on Soccer AM and drawn by Charlie Austin and Ed Skrein. Doncaster will travel to face York City.

Season summary

Detailed Summary 
Results on penalties taken as draws

Score overview

References

Doncaster Rovers F.C. seasons
Doncaster Rovers